The Hijack That Went South is a 2013 Finnish drama film directed by Aleksi Mäkelä. The film is based on real events, the 1978 Oulu Hijacking.

Cast 
 Kari Hietalahti – Aarno Lamminparras
 Aake Kalliala – Captain Rajapaltio
 Jussi Vatanen – Co-pilot Snock
  – Ylppö
  – Omenainen
 Merja Larivaara – Kananen
 Hannu-Pekka Björkman – Juristi Marttinen

References

External links 

2013 comedy films
2013 films
Films directed by Aleksi Mäkelä
Finnish comedy films
2010s Finnish-language films